Taylor Peak, elevation , is a summit in the Front Range of north central Colorado. The peak is in Rocky Mountain National Park at the head of Loch Vale and just north of Taylor Glacier.

Historical names
Taylor Peak – 1932 
The Bangs

See also
List of Colorado mountain ranges
List of Colorado mountain summits
List of Colorado fourteeners
List of Colorado 4000 meter prominent summits
List of the most prominent summits of Colorado
List of Colorado county high points

References

External links

Mountains of Rocky Mountain National Park
Mountains of Grand County, Colorado
Mountains of Larimer County, Colorado
North American 4000 m summits